Citroën India is a subsidiary of Stellantis of France, as a joint-venture with CK Birla Group, for the manufacture and sales of Citroën in India. Citroën entered the Indian market in 2021. Citroën vehicles will be manufactured at CK Birla Group's production facilities in Tamil Nadu.

History 
This is the third attempt by Groupe PSA to enter the Indian market. During the presentation of FY18 results of Groupe PSA, the chairman confirmed that Citroën was the chosen brand to enter the Indian markets.

Groupe PSA had signed two joint ventures with companies of India's CK Birla Group for vehicle assembly, distribution and powertrain manufacturing of its cars in the country. The French carmaker was initially supposed to enter the Indian market in 2020. However, the plan was delayed amidst the COVID-19 pandemic and the subsequent lockdown.

Prior to launching the India-spec C5 Aircross SUV, Citroën India's research revealed that comfort is critical criteria for new car buyers in India. Production of the C5 Aircross had started in January 2021 at the Tiruvallur plant in Tamil Nadu. Groupe PSA has made an investment of around Rs.2500 crore to enter the Indian market.

Products 
Citroën India is developing several models specifically for the Indian market, including EVs, releasing in 2021–2022. The C5 Aircross unveiled on 1 February 2021 and launched on 7 April 2021 in two variants: Feel and Shine, with single and dual tone interiors, equipped with a 2.0-litre diesel engine. According to reports, subsequent cars will not support a diesel engine.

Citroën India revealed the C3 in September 2021 ahead of its India launch in the first half of 2022. The C3 is the first of three models under Citroën's C-cubed program, and has been specifically developed for emerging markets like India and South America. The C3 will be locally manufactured here in India with more than 90 percent localisation.

Current models

References

Citroën
Automotive companies of India
Indian companies established in 2019
2019 establishments in Tamil Nadu
Automotive companies established in 2019
Manufacturing companies based in Chennai
Indian subsidiaries of foreign companies